Hospice is a type of care and a philosophy of care which focuses on the palliation of a terminally ill patient's symptoms.

Africa

Foundation for Hospices in Sub-Saharan Africa
Global Partners in Care

Europe

Acorns Children's Hospice, non-profit in Birmingham, Walsall & Worcester of West Midlands, England
Claire House Children's Hospice, non-profit in Bebington, Merseyside, England
Demelza Hospice Care for Children
Farleigh Hospice, non-profit in Chelmsford, Essex, England
Grand Master of the Sacred Apostolic Hospice
Hospice-Anthelme Verreau
Hospice Comtesse, town museum in Lille, France
Hospices de Beaune, museum in Beaune, Bourgogne, France
Kirkwood Hospice, Huddersfield, West Yorkshire, England
Linda Mbeki Hospice
Martin House Hospice
Royal Trinity Hospice, oldest in the United Kingdom
St. Francis Hospice, Raheny
Shooting Star Children's Hospices, non-profit in Hampton, London, England
Sobell House Hospice, non-profit in Oxfordshire, Oxford, England
Strathcarron Hospice, non-profit in Denny, Falkirk, Stirlingshire, Scotland
St. Eloy's Hospice
Trinity Hospice, Blackpool

United States and Canada

American Academy of Hospice and Palliative Medicine, professional organization in Glenview, Illinois
Community Hospice of Northeast Florida, non-profit in Jacksonville, Florida
Gentiva Health Services, national provider of hospice and home health services
Hospice Palliative Care Ontario, professional organization in Ontario, Canada
Rainbow Hospice, non-profit in Chicago, Illinois
St. Francis Hospice, Hawaii, first hospice in the state, established in 1978

References

Hospice
Health-related lists